The great wall of Awwam, also called the Awwam enclosure, is an ancient Sabaean wall that surrounds the gardens and the holy sites of Awwam in Yemen.

History 

The earliest inscription found about the gardens' massive enclosure was by Mukarrib Yada`'il Dharih in the 7th century BCE. The enclosure is defined by a massive oval shaped wall, measuring approximately 757 m long and 13 m high, however the original height can't be determined for certainty, and it's difficult to assess its full extent.

Bibliography
  Francis D. K. Ching, Mark Jarzombek, and Vikramaditya Prakash, A Global History of Architecture, Third edition. ed. (Hoboken, New Jersey: Wiley, 2017).

References

Archaeological sites in Yemen
Sabaean architecture
Architecture of ancient Yemen
History of Yemen